Ocean Entertainment Limited is an independent Canadian production company based in Halifax, Nova Scotia. Established in 1995, the company has specialized in the production of television series and documentaries.

Ocean Entertainment also owns Ocean Digital, a full service picture editing facility with five digital suites, and Tweeq Audio,  fully equipped audio post facility.

Current and past productions
 Spice Goddess
 The Candy Show
 The Château Dinner
 Chef Abroad
 Chef at Home
 Chef at Large
 Childhood Lost
 Family Renovation
 French Food at Home
 The Food Hunter
 The Hero's Hero
 The Inn Chef
 Mechanical Chicks
 Minyan on the Mira
 The Moody Brood
 Mountain Magic
 Nightmare in Canada
 Red Hot and Ready
 Reinventing Ritual
 Resourceful Renovator
 Saturday Night
 Shadow Hunter
 Shag Harbour UFO Incident
 To Catch a Killer

External links
 Official website

Television production companies of Canada